Aspilapteryx seriata is a moth of the family Gracillariidae. It is known from South Africa.

References

Further reading
 

Endemic moths of South Africa
Aspilapteryx
Moths of Africa
Moths described in 1912
Taxa named by Edward Meyrick